The 1949 Argentine Primera División was the 59th season of top-flight football in Argentina. The season began on April 2 and ended on December 10.

Quilmes returned to Primera while Rosario Central and Tigre were relegated. Racing Club won its 11th league title.

League standings

References

Argentine Primera División seasons
Argentine Primera Division
Primera Division